The 2016 Antonio Savoldi–Marco Cò – Trofeo Dimmidisì was a professional tennis tournament played on clay courts. It was the fifteenth edition of the tournament which is part of the 2016 ATP Challenger Tour. It took place in Manerbio, Italy between 22 and 28 August 2016.

ATP entrants

Seeds

 1 Rankings are as of August 15, 2016.

Other entrants
The following players received wildcards into the singles main draw:
  Andrea Pellegrino
  Edoardo Eremin
  Lorenzo Sonego
  Stefanos Tsitsipas

The following player received entry into the singles main draw as a special exempt :
  Maximilian Marterer

The following player received entry into the singles main draw with a protected ranking:
  Fabiano de Paula

The following player received entry as an alternate:
  Pedro Cachín

The following players received entry from the qualifying draw:
  Jonathan Eysseric
  Laurynas Grigelis
  Nikola Mektić
  Walter Trusendi

Champions

Singles

  Leonardo Mayer def.  Filip Krajinović, 7–6(7-3), 7–5.

Doubles

  Nikola Mektić /  Antonio Šančić def.  Juan Ignacio Galarza /  Leonardo Mayer, 7–5, 6–1.

External links
Official Website
ITF Search
ATP official site

Antonio Savoldi-Marco Co - Trofeo Dimmidisi
Antonio Savoldi–Marco Cò – Trofeo Dimmidisì
2016 in Italian tennis